Mino De Rossi (21 May 1931 – 7 January 2022) was an Italian road and track cyclist, who won the gold medal in the men's 4.000m team pursuit at the 1952 Summer Olympics, alongside Marino Morettini, Loris Campana and Guido Messina. He was a professional road cyclist from 1952 to 1968. De Rossi died on 7 January 2022, at the age of 90.

Major results

Track
1951
 1st  Individual pursuit, UCI Amateur Track World Championships
1952
 1st  Team pursuit, Summer Olympics
 2nd  Individual pursuit, UCI Amateur Track World Championships
1959
 1st Six Days of Buenos Aires (with Jorge Bátiz)
1963
 1st Six Days of Montreal (with Ferdinando Terruzzi)

Road
1952
 2nd Piccolo Giro di Lombardia
1953
 10th Giro di Lombardia
1954
 3rd Giro di Lombardia
 4th Giro di Romagna
1967
 3rd Giro dell'Appennino

References

External links

1931 births
2022 deaths
Italian track cyclists
Italian male cyclists
Cyclists at the 1952 Summer Olympics
Olympic cyclists of Italy
Olympic gold medalists for Italy
People from Arquata Scrivia
Olympic medalists in cycling
Medalists at the 1952 Summer Olympics
Cyclists from Piedmont
Sportspeople from the Province of Alessandria
20th-century Italian people